The papal deposing power was the most powerful tool of the political authority claimed by and on behalf of the Roman Pontiff, in medieval and early modern thought, amounting to the assertion of the Pope's power to declare a Christian monarch heretical and powerless to rule.

Pope Gregory VII's Dictatus Papae (c. 1075) claimed for the Pope "that it may be permitted to him to depose emperors" (12) and asserted the papal power to "absolve subjects from their fealty to wicked men" (27).

Oaths of allegiance held together the feudal political structure of medieval Europe. The principle behind deposition was that the Pope, as the ultimate representative of God from whom all oaths draw their force, could in extreme circumstances absolve a ruler's subjects of their allegiance, thereby rendering the ruler powerless. In a medieval Europe in which all confessed the Pope as head of the visible Church, it gave concrete embodiment to the superiority of the spiritual power over the temporal—the other side, so to speak, of the role of Popes and bishops in anointing and crowning emperors and kings.

History

Some prominent papal depositions:

Later historical reception
The claim was contested by both Catholic and Protestant rulers, as part of the ongoing discussion of the demarcation of spiritual and temporal authority. Catholic writers differed on the question of whether the deposing power was an integral part of the Catholic faith, an issue that was debated intensively in the early seventeenth century. The political points involved were later swept up in the formulation of Gallicanism as a distinctive doctrine limiting papal authority.

Roger Widdrington
The Oath of Allegiance (1606) formulated for James I of England contained a specific denial of the deposing power. It triggered the Catholic Roger Widdrington's opposition to the unconditional acceptance by Catholics of the deposing power. Widdrington instead used the language of probabilism from moral theology, claiming that the deposing power was only a 'probable' doctrine, not a matter of faith.

Archbishop Thomas Maria Ghilini
In a letter to the Archbishops of Ireland dated 14 October 1768, the papal legate at Brussels, Archbishop Thomas Maria Ghilini, wrote that "the doctrine [that 'no faith or promise is to be kept with heretics, or princes excommunicated; or that Princes deprived by the Pope, may be deposed or murdered by their subjects, or by any other person whatsoever'] is defended and maintained by most Catholic nations, and has been often followed in practice by the Apostolic See. It cannot therefore upon any account be declared 'detestable and abominable' by a Catholic, without incurring, by such declaration, the imputation of a proposition, rash, false, scandalous, and injurious to the Holy See."

In a meeting at Thurles in 1776, the bishops of Munster "with the exception of Dr. MacMahon of Killaloe, who absented himself, passed sentence on the Hibernia Dominicana and its supplement [in which Ghilini's letter of 1768 had been printed], giving our entire disapprobation of them, because they tend to weaken and subvert that allegiance, fidelity, and submission, which we acknowledge ourselves we owe from duty and from gratitude to his Majesty King George III., because they are likely to disturb the public peace and tranquillity, by raising unnecessary scruples in the minds of our people, and sowing the seeds of dissensions amongst them, in points in which they ought, both from their religion and their interest, to be firmly united; and because they manifestly tend to give a handle to those who differ in religious principles with us, to impute to us maxims that we utterly reject, and which are by no means founded in the doctrines of the Roman Catholic Church."

Contestation by the bishops of Munster
In 1774 "[t]he Munster bishops drew up a declaration repudiating the papal deposing power and denying that the Pope had any civil or temporal authority in Ireland. This was accepted by most of the Catholic clergy and was made into an oath set out in Act of Parliament in 1774. It is significant that the bishops did not consult the Pope." "[W]hile deploring the terms of the oath, the Congregation of Propaganda considered it prudent not to condemn it lest it increase the hatred of Protestants and the difficulties of Catholics. But the faithful were to be privately warned against it."

An English translation of the text of the letter from the Propaganda dated 6 January 1776 appeared in Collectanea Hibernica in 1968.  The translator refers to the recipient as Bishop Troy of Ossory. However, Bishop Troy was not appointed until 16 December 1776.  His predecessor Bishop Thomas Burke had died on 25 September 1776. The translation is entitled "Copy of an Instruction sent to Bishop Troy of Ossory by Stefano Borgia, secretary of the Congregation of Propaganda, 6 Jan. 1776". After noting the letter from the Bishop of Ossory, the letter states: "the views put forward by Troy deserve the highest commendation of the Holy See [...] whoever takes the oath in its present form affirms, with God as his witness, that he denounces and rejects the opinion that the pope has power to free subjects from an oath of loyalty taken by them to their rulers, despite the fact that almost all the old theologians [...] and general councils supported this teaching [...] such an opinion infringes greatly on the rights of the Holy See". The letter continues "[N]evertheless, if the present formula were declared impious and inadmissable by the Holy See and if the pope issued letters to that effect, as did Paul V, it is feared that such a mode of action would [...] be fraught with danger and do more harm than good to the catholics [...] in the present circumstances the approach used by the Holy See for the past century or so must be continued; in other places, and particularly in Holland, certain forms of oaths have been prescribed by the civil authorities [...]; the Holy See has not formally approved of such forms, nor has it condemned them publicly; the same approach is advisable in the case of the Irish catholics; although the former hostility shown by the protestants towards the catholics [...] appears to have died down somewhat, there is a danger that a public declaration concerning the oath would arouse old hatreds and draw down the displeasure of the civil authorities on the Holy See, [...] consequently, the circumstances and the time must be taken into consideration" The letter concludes: "[N]evertheless, although the Holy See may refrain from issuing a formal public decree against the oath, it does not automatically follow that the formula is to be accepted; nor does it mean that it is not right for the bishops [...] to dissuade their subjects from taking such a dangerous and obnoxious oath; indeed, it is their duty to admonish the faithful, especially in private conversations with them [...]; these arc the directions which the Congregation considers it opportune to send you in accordance with the intentions of the pope."

The original Latin text was printed in Analecta Hibernica in 1946. It states that the letter was signed by Giuseppe Maria Castelli, Cardinal Prefect and by Stephanus Borgia, Secretary. "When Archbishop Butler of Cashel had too hastily renounced the deposing power, and his example was followed so hastily by others, that it was too late to retract, he received from the sacred congregation of Propaganda a letter of Rebuke, because he had presumed to transact a business so momentous, without previously advising with the Court of Rome" The letter stated: "Your duty and the usual respect due to His Holiness seemed to require that you should not have determined anything in a business of such magnitude, without first consulting the sovereign pontiff [...] It was this that gave no small pain to his Holiness and this sacred congregation"

Cardinal Leonardo Antonelli
In a rescript dated 23 June 1791, addressed to the Roman Catholic archbishops and bishops of Ireland by Cardinal Leonardo Antonelli by the authority and command of Pope Pius VI, it was stated: "The See of Rome never taught that Faith is not to be kept with the Heterodox: that an Oath to Kings separated from Catholic Communion can be violated: that it is lawful for the Bishop of Rome to invade their temporal rights and dominions. We do consider an attempt or design against the life of Kings and Princes, even under the pretext of Religion, as a horrid and detestable crime."

Pope Pius VII
In 1805, Pope Pius VII stated in a letter to the Papal Nuncio at Vienna that "[T]he Church […] had moreover established, as the penalty of the crime of heresy, the confiscation and loss of all property possessed by heretics. This penalty […] as far as concerns sovereignties and fiefs […] is a rule of the canon law cap. Absolutus XVI de Haereticis, that the subjects of a Prince manifestly heretical are released from all obligation to him, dispensed from all allegiance and all homage. To be sure we are fallen into such calamitous times, that it is not possible for the spouse of Jesus Christ to practice, nor even expedient for her to recall, her holy maxims of just rigour against the enemies of the faith. But, although she cannot exercise her right of deposing heretics from their principalities"

Henry Edward Manning
In 1860 Henry Edward Manning, who later became Roman Catholic Archbishop of Westminster and a Cardinal, wrote, "That vast chimera at which the English people especially stand in awe, the deposing power of the Pope, what was it but that supreme arbitration whereby the highest power in the world, the Vicar of the Incarnate Son of God, anointed to be high priest, to be the supreme temporal ruler, sat in his tribunal, impartially to judge between nation and nation, between people and prince, between sovereign and subject; and that deposing power grew up by the providential action of God in the world, and it taught subjects obedience, and princes clemency." In The Vatican Decrees in their bearing on Civil Allegiance, published in 1874, Cardinal Manning wrote: "I affirm that the deposition of Henry IV. and Frederic II. of Germany were legitimate, right, and lawful; and I affirm that a deposition of Queen Victoria would not be legitimate, nor right, nor lawful, because the moral conditions which were present to justify the deposition of the Emperors of Germany are absent in the case of Queen Victoria; and therefore such an act could not be done."

The Tablet, December 1874
The issue of The Tablet (owned by the future Cardinal Vaughan) for 5 December 1874 stated: "It is true that St. PETER never used the deposing power, but that was because Christendom had not yet begun to exist ; it is equally true that neither Pius IX., nor any of his successors, are ever likely to use it, but that is because Christendom has ceased to exist [...] But if Christendom should ever be restored, which does not seem likely, we profess our unhesitating conviction that the deposing power of GOD'S Vicar would revive with it." The issue of the same publication for 12 December 1874 contained a letter from Charles Langdale (born 1822) stating: "In common with many of my contemporaries I have, more than once, taken the Catholic oath, a portion of which runs as follows :—'And I do further declare that it is not an article of my Faith [...] that Princes excommunicated or deprived by the Pope, or any other authority of the See of Rome, may be deposed or murdered by their subjects, or by any person whatsoever; and I do declare that I do not believe the Pope of Rome [...] hath, or ought to have, any temporal or civil jurisdiction, power, superiority, or preeminence, directly or indirectly, within this realm. [...]' I cannot, therefore, agree with the writer of the article in question, when he says, "we (Catholics) firmly believe that the Deposing Power [...] is manifestly included among the gifts of Peter." In the issue of the same publication for 19 December 1874, the writer of the article' wrote: "Mr. Langdale 'regrets' my observations on the Deposing Power because he and others have taken an oath that they do not believe it. We have, therefore, on one side, the Popes who actually used this power, the Christian nations who obeyed, and the great theologians who justified it; and, on the other, Mr. Langdale's oath. This hardly seems to constitute an equation. It is all on one side, and nothing on the other."

1910 New Catholic Dictionary
In the words of the 1910 New Catholic Dictionary: "Present day popes have no mind to resuscitate their deposing power. As Pius IX said to the deputation of the Academia of the Catholic Religion on 21 July 1871: 'Although certain Popes have at times exercised their deposing power in extreme cases, they did so according to the public law then in force and by the agreement of the Christian nations who reverenced in the Pope the Supreme Judge of Christ extended to passing judgment even civiliter on princes and individual states. But altogether different is the present condition of affairs and only malice can confound things and times so different. Pius IX had excommunicated King Victor Emmanuel II of Italy in 1860 when Victor Emmanuel accepted the annexation of Romagna, and Victor Emmanuel had captured Rome from Pius in 1870.

1913 Catholic Encyclopedia
The 1913 Catholic Encyclopedia's article on English Post-Reformation Oaths states: "In later days some people might think [the deposing power] out of date, inapplicable, extinct, perhaps even a mistake" and that by the time of James I of England, "the discipline of papal deposition for extreme case of misgovernment [...] would never be in vogue again, even in Catholic countries."

See also

Civil allegiance
Divine right of kings

Notes

References

External links
 Medieval Sourcebook: Gregory VII: Dictatus Papae 1090
 Medieval Sourcebook: Gregory VII: First Deposition and Banning of Henry IV (Feb 22, 1076)
 New Catholic Dictionary entry

History of the papacy
Catholic theology and doctrine